Eddie Roberts (born 16 November 1947) is an English footballer, who played as a goalkeeper in the Football League for Tranmere Rovers. He also played for Wigan Athletic in the Northern Premier League.

References

Tranmere Rovers F.C. players
English Football League players
Wigan Athletic F.C. players
Association football goalkeepers
Living people
1947 births
Footballers from Liverpool
English footballers